Jandwa is a village in Ratangarh tehsil in Churu district in Rajasthan. It is situated at a distance of 25 km from Churu in the west direction. The village was founded about 450 years ago by Jandu (Janu (clan)) Jats, who moved elsewhere and Khichar Jats settled here. Khichar Jats came to this place from [[Sidhmukh]
Now there are so many youngsters of the village are serving proudly in defence forces and so many are doctors,engineers, teachers and businessman.

Jat Gotras in the village
The population of the village Jandwa is about 500 families out of them Khichar is the only Jat gotra with population of 250 families.  There is only one other Jat family of Ruhil.

References

Villages in Churu district